Frederick Bowden (November 1904 – after 1934), generally known as Frank Bowden, was an English professional footballer who played in the Football League for Birmingham and Coventry City.

Bowden was born in the Kings Heath district of Birmingham. A pacy winger, he made his debut for Birmingham in the First Division on 26 December 1925 in a 2–1 defeat away at Tottenham Hotspur. This turned out to be his only first-team appearance for the club, and he moved into non-league football in the Midlands. Bowden then spent time on West Ham United's books, without appearing in the Football League side, and joined Coventry City, for whom he played 38 times in the Third Division South and scored eight goals. He later signed for Chesterfield and for second spells with Coventry and West Ham, but played no more league football.

References

1904 births
Year of death missing
Place of death missing
Footballers from Birmingham, West Midlands
English footballers
Association football forwards
Birmingham City F.C. players
Kidderminster Harriers F.C. players
Stourbridge F.C. players
West Ham United F.C. players
Coventry City F.C. players
Chesterfield F.C. players
English Football League players